The Colombian electric ray (Diplobatis colombiensis) is a species of fish in the family Narcinidae endemic to Colombia.  Its natural habitat is open seas.

References

Colombian electric ray
Endemic fauna of Colombia
Fish of Colombia
Strongly electric fish
Colombian electric ray
Taxonomy articles created by Polbot